
Year 836 (DCCCXXXVI) was a leap year starting on Saturday (link will display the full calendar) of the Julian calendar.

Events 
 By place 
 Abbasid Caliphate 
 Driven by tensions between his favoured Turkish guard and the populace of Baghdad, Abbasid caliph al-Mu'tasim moves his residence to the new city of Samarra, 130 km north of Baghdad. With brief interruptions, the city will remain the seat of the Abbasid caliphs until 892.

 Britain 
 Battle of Carhampton:  Danish Vikings arrive in West Saxon, North Devon and Somerset. King Egbert of Wessex fights them, but he is forced to withdraw.

 Europe 
 July 4 – Pactum Sicardi: Prince Sicard of Benevento signs a 5-year armistice with the duchies of Sorrento, Naples and Amalfi. He recognizes the trade of merchants among the three cities in Southern Italy.
 Malamir, ruler (khan) of the Bulgarian Empire, dies after a 4-year reign and is succeeded by his nephew Presian I. Because of his young age and inexperience, the Bulgarian state affairs are dominated by his minister and commander-in-chief Isbul.
 Pietro Tradonico is appointed doge of Venice (until 864).

 By topic 
 Religion 
 The Basilica of St. Castor in Koblenz (Rhineland-Pfalz) is constructed.
 The oldest known mention is made of the city of Soest (modern Germany).

Births 
 Æthelberht, king of Wessex (approximate date)
 Al-Musta'in, Muslim caliph (d. 866)
 Fujiwara no Mototsune, Japanese regent (d. 891)
 Ibn al-Rumi, Muslim poet (d. 896)
 Luo Hongxin, Chinese warlord (d. 898)
 Mihira Bhoja, king of the Gurjara-Pratihara Dynasty (d. 885)
 Wei Zhuang, Chinese poet (approximate date)

Deaths 
 March 17 – Haito, bishop of Basel
 Adalram, archbishop of Salzburg
 Aznar Sánchez, duke of Gascony 
 Herefrith, bishop of Winchester
 Heungdeok, king of Silla (b. 777)
 Lambert I, Frankish nobleman
 Malamir, ruler of the Bulgarian Empire
 Matfrid, Frankish nobleman
 Muhammad ibn Idris, Idrisid emir of Morocco
 Nicetas the Patrician, Byzantine official
 Prosigoj, Serbian prince (approximate date)
 Ralpacan, emperor of Tibet (b. 802)
 Wala of Corbie, Frankish nobleman
 Wang Zhixing, general of the Tang Dynasty (b. 758)

References